Atasu Dam is a concrete-face rock-fill dam on the Gaylan River,  south of Trabzon in Trabzon Province, Turkey. It was built between 1998 and 2010 for the primary purpose of drinking water supply but also has a 5 MW hydroelectric power station.

See also

List of dams and reservoirs in Turkey

References

Dams in Trabzon Province
Concrete-face rock-fill dams
Hydroelectric power stations in Turkey
Dams completed in 2010